Ilhéu Derrubado is a small uninhabited islet about  off the north coast of the island of Boa Vista, Cape Verde. It is part of the protected area Parque Natural do Norte. Derrubado is also the name of the coastal area near the islet. The nearest settlement is Bofarreira,  to the southwest.

References

Uninhabited islands of Cape Verde
Geography of Boa Vista, Cape Verde